China Merchants Shekou Industrial Zone Holdings Co., Ltd (CMSK; Chinese: 招商局蛇口工业区控股股份有限公司 or 招商蛇口) is a Chinese public company based in Shenzhen. The company itself is a subsidiary of China Merchants Group. It was founded in 1978.

The company privatized China Merchants Property, a blue chip of Shenzhen Stock Exchange, in turn floated itself to the same exchange. Shekou Industrial Zone Holdings also owned Shenzhen Nanyou Holdings.

References

External links
 Official site
 

1979 establishments in China
Companies listed on the Shenzhen Stock Exchange
Companies in the CSI 100 Index
Companies based in Shenzhen
Real estate companies established in 1979
Chinese companies established in 1979